Haj Wakil castle is a rarted castle located in Arak County in Markazi Province, The longevity of this fortress dates back to the Qajar dynasty.

References 

Castles in Iran
Qajar castles